The 2008 Western Michigan Broncos football team represented Western Michigan University in the 2008 NCAA football season.  The team was coached by Bill Cubit and played their homes game in Waldo Stadium in Kalamazoo, Michigan.

Western Michigan was 9–4 overall and 6–2 in the Mid-American Conference after defeating conference opponents Northern Illinois, Temple, Ohio, Buffalo, Eastern Michigan and Toledo, Big Ten Conference member Illinois, Western Athletic Conference member Idaho and Football Championship Subdivision team .  Western Michigan lost to Nebraska, rival Central Michigan and Ball State.  Western Michigan played in the 2008 Texas Bowl, where they fell to Rice on December 30, 2008.

Over the course of the 2008 season, the Broncos received votes in the AP Poll and the USA Today Coaches Poll, culminating with a top 30 ranking and 9–2 record in week 13. The Broncos no longer received votes after dropping their final two games.

2007 summary

The Broncos finished the 2007 season 5–7 overall and 3–4 in the Mid-American Conference (MAC).  The highlight of the season was the 28–19 victory over the Iowa Hawkeyes, a team that finished 5th in the Big Ten Conference.

Pre-season

WMU was picked to finish third in the West Division, according to the MAC News Media Association.  The Broncos also earned two first place votes and one vote to win the MAC Championship Game.  Rival Central Michigan was picked to win the West Division.  Bowling Green was selected to win the East Division.

Watch lists
 Louis Delmas, FS – East–West Shrine Game
 Londen Fryar, CB – East–West Shrine Game, Jim Thorpe Award
 Branden Ledbetter, TE – John Mackey Award
 Jamarko Simmons, WR – East–West Shrine Game

Recruiting class
The 2008 recruiting class was ranked #1 in the MAC and #65 overall by Rivals.

Schedule

Game summaries

Nebraska

Nebraska jumped out to a 17–0 lead in the second quarter that Western Michigan could not recover from.

WMU quarterback Tim Hiller was 30 of 49 for 342 yards and two touchdowns.  Tight end Branden Ledbetter caught nine balls for 123 yards and a touchdown.  The Broncos were held to eight rushing yards for the game.

Recap | Boxscore | WMU pregame notes

Northern Illinois

In the Mid-American Conference opening game for both teams, WMU overcame a 19–14 fourth quarter NIU lead with two Tim Hiller touchdown passes in the span of three minutes and six seconds.  Hiller completed 21 of 30 passes for 186 yards and three touchdowns for the game and running back Brandon West carried the ball 25 times for 175 yards.

NIU was playing without its freshman starting quarterback Chandler Harnish who left the game in the first quarter due to an injury.  NIU outgained WMU 439 to 384 in total yards and had possession of the ball for 34:20 opposed to WMU's 25:40 time of possession.

Recap | Boxscore | WMU pregame notes

Idaho

After Idaho scored early in the third quarter to tie the game at 14–14, WMU outscored the Vandals 37–14 to cruise to a 51–28 win over the Western Athletic Conference member.  WMU quarterback Tim Hiller completed 23 of 31 passes for 241 yards and four touchdowns.  Wide receiver Jamarko Simmons caught six passes for 86 yards and two touchdowns.

Despite outgaining WMU 455 yards to 416 yards, Idaho could not stop WMU from scoring 23 points in 4:32 during the third quarter to put the game away.

Recap | Boxscore | WMU pregame notes

Tennessee Tech

Led by quarterback Tim Hiller's five touchdown passes, Western Michigan defeated Football Championship Subdivision opponent Tennessee Tech 41–7.  The Broncos outgained Tennessee Tech 633 yards to 251 and gained 30 first downs compared to 13.  Hiller completed 27 of 31 passes for 333 yards and running back Brandon West carried the ball for 133 yards and a touchdown on 14 rushes.  Wide receiver Jamarko Simmons led all receivers with 10 catches for 115 yards and a touchdown.

Recap | Boxscore | WMU pregame notes

Temple

Recap | Boxscore | WMU pregame notes

Ohio

Recap | Boxscore | WMU pregame notes

Buffalo

Recap | Boxscore | WMU pregame notes

Central Michigan

Recap | Boxscore | WMU pregame notes

Eastern Michigan

Recap | Boxscore | WMU pregame notes

Illinois

Recap | Boxscore | WMU pregame notes

Toledo

Recap | Boxscore | WMU pregame notes

Ball State

Recap | Boxscore | WMU pregame notes

Rice

Recap | Boxscore | WMU pregame notes

Awards

Mid-American Conference Player of the Week
 Offense
 Tim Hiller, QB (2) – week 3 (23–31, 74.2%, 241 yards, four touchdowns), week 7 (42–63, 345 yards, four touchdowns, school record for pass completions and attempts)
 Jamarko Simmons, WR – week 11 (11 catches, 174 yards, touchdown)
 Defense
 E. J. Biggers, CB – week 10 (Nine tackles, one tackle for a loss, interception, pass break up)
 Louis Delmas, FS (2) – week 2 (10 tackles, interception, fumble recovery), week 11 (12 tackles)
 Boston McCornell, LB – week 5 (10 tackles (six solo tackles), forced fumble, fumble recovery)
 Special teams
 John Potter, PK – week 11 (three field goals (31, 22, 45 yards), two point after touchdowns)
 Brandon West, RB/KR – week 6 (239 all-purpose yards, three touchdowns (one rushing, two receiving))
 Aaron Winchester, RB/KR – week 12 (71 kick return yards, 111 rushing yards, 22 receiving yards, 204 all-purpose yards)

Mid-American Conference Scholar Athlete of the Week
 Tim Hiller, QB – week 2, week 3

John Mackey National Tight End of the Week
 Branden Ledbetter, TE – week 7 (six receptions, 40 yards, touchdown)

All-MAC Team
Western Michigan had 12 All-MAC selections.

 First team
 Louis Delmas, FS
 Austin Pritchard, LB
 Jamarko Simmons, WR
 Second team
 E. J. Biggers, CB
 Zach Davidson, DL
 Londen Fryar, CB
 Branden Ledbetter, TE
 Third team
 Tim Hiller, QB
 Boston McCornell, LB
 Juan Nunez, WR
 Phillip Sawnson, OL
 Brandon West, RB

Coaching staff
Bill Cubit – Head Coach
 Steve Morrison – Defensive Coordinator
 Tim Daoust – Defensive Secondary
 Mike Grant – Wide Receivers
 Rick Kravitz – Safeties
 Peter McCarthy – Defensive Line
 Jake Moreland – Tight Ends
 A. J. Ricker – Offensive Assistant
 Mike Sabock – Running Backs, Special Teams
 Bob Stanley – Offensive Line
 Tim Knox – Director of Football Operations
 Ryan Cubit – Offensive Graduate Assistant
 Matt Ludeman – Defensive Graduate Assistant

References

External links
 Team and individual statistics

Western Michigan
Western Michigan Broncos football seasons
Western Michigan Broncos football